Ben Goldberg is an American clarinet player and composer.

Career
In the early 1990s, Ben Goldberg performed alongside electric bassist Dan Seamans and percussionist Kenny Wollesen as the New Klezmer Trio. They went on to produce three albums and the free improvisation on "Masks and Faces" was described as having "kicked open the door for radical experiments with Ashkenazi roots music." Goldberg's musicality has influenced and inspired local musicians in the San Francisco Bay Area.

Goldberg is also the founder of the music label BAG Production.

Recently Goldberg has branched out into songwriting. His "Orphic Machine" project, largely commissioned by Chamber Music America, was performed in Los Angeles. The song-cycle is based on the writings of Allen Grossman and, for one critic, "the piece's thoughtful, sprawling compositions course through such a variety of styles and open-ended impulses that it would be tempting to dub this a new kind of world music". Regarding songwriting and composing, in a 2010 profile piece in All About Jazz, Goldberg said, "I don't just want to give people something that they can appreciate or understand, or that makes them think, or something like that. I used to kind of feel that that's what I wanted to do, but that's not what I want anymore. I want to give people something that they can love."

In 2011, Goldberg was named the No. 1 Rising Star Clarinetist by the Down Beat Critic's Poll.

Discography

As leader
 New Klezmer Trio Masks and Faces (Tzadik, 1991)
 The Relative Value of Things (33 1/4), with Kenny Wollesen (1993)
 Junk Genius Junk Genius (Knitting Factory Works) with John Schott, Trevor Dunn, and Kenny Wollesen (1995)
 New Klezmer Trio Melt Zonk Rewire (Tzadik, 1995)
 Light at the Crossroads (Songlines) with Marty Ehrlich (1997)
 What Comes Before (Tzadik), reflections on post-tonal harmonic structures with John Schott and Michael Sarin (1998)
 Twelve Minor (Avant) (1998)
 Ben Goldberg Trio Here By Now (Music and Arts) with Trevor Dunn and Elliot Humberto Kavee (1998)
 Junk Genius Ghost of Electricity (Songlines) (1999)
 New Klezmer Trio Short for Something (Tzadik, 2000)
 Almost Never (nuscope) with John Schott and Trevor Dunn (2000)
 Ben Goldberg Eight Phrases for Jefferson Rubin (Victo) (2004)
 Ben Goldberg Quintet The Door, the Hat, the Chair, the Fact (Cryptogramophone), a record of compositions dedicated to Steve Lacy (2006)
 Plays Monk (Long Song Records, 2007) – with Scott Amendola and Devin Hoff
 Tin Hat The Sad Machinery of Spring (Rykodisc, 2007)
 Ben Goldberg Go Home (BAG Production, 2009)
 Ben Goldberg Trio Speech Communication (Tzadik, 2009) – with Greg Cohen and Kenny Wollesen
 Clarinet Thing Cry, Want (BC Records, 2009)
 Tin Hat Foreign Legion (BAG Production, 2010)
 Ben Goldberg Quartet – Baal: Book of Angels Volume 15 (Tzadik, 2010) – John Zorn's Masada Book 2
 Tin Hat The Rain is a Handsome Animal (New Amsterdam, 2012)
 Subatomic Particle Homesick Blues (BAG Production, 2013) – with Joshua Redman, Ron Miles, Ches Smith, Scott Amendola, and Devin Hoff
 Unfold Ordinary Mind (BAG Production, 2013) – with Ellery Eskelin, Nels Cline, and Ches Smith
 Worry Later (BAG Production, 2014) – Thelonious Monk compositions
 DIALOGUE (BAG Production, 2015) – with Myra Melford
 Orphic Machine (BAG Production, 2015)
 Vol. 1: The Humanities (BAG Production, 2017)
 Good Day for Cloud Fishing (Pyroclastic, 2019) – to poems by Dean Young

As sideman
With Nels Cline
 New Monastery (Cryptogramophone, 2006)
 Lovers (Blue Note, 2016)

With Kris Davis
 Save Your Breath (Clean Feed, 2015)

With Allison Miller's Boom Tic Boom
 Otis the Polar Bear (Royal Potato Family, 2016)

With Jamie Saft
 Borscht Belt Studies (Tzadik, 2011)

With Myra Melford
 Myra Melford's Be Bread The Whole Tree Gone (Firehouse 12, 2010)

References

Further reading
 February 2013 review of "Unfold Ordinary Mind" and "Subatomic Particle Homesick Blues" in The New York Times

External links 
 
 BAG Productions BAG Production record label
 
 

Place of birth missing (living people)
1959 births
20th-century American composers
American jazz clarinetists
American jazz composers
American male jazz composers
Living people
Mills College alumni
Musicians from Berkeley, California
Musicians from Denver
University of California, Santa Cruz alumni
21st-century American composers
Jazz musicians from California
Jazz musicians from Colorado
21st-century clarinetists
20th-century American male musicians
21st-century American male musicians
Music & Arts artists
20th-century jazz composers
21st-century jazz composers